Thomas Danett (also spelt Danette; died 19 September 1483) was a Dean of Windsor from 1481 to 1483.

Career

He was appointed:
Principal of St Alban Hall, Oxford 1468–1477
Prebendary of Henfield in Chichester 1472
Rector of Brixton Deverill, Wiltshire 1469
Rector of Slapton
Prebendary of St Stephen's, Westminster 
Prebendary of Gaia Major in Lichfield 1473–1483
Prebendary of Farendon c. Balderton in Lincoln 1480–1483
Dean of Wolverhampton, a deanery united with Windsor, 1481
Prebendary of Cherminster c. Bere in Salisbury 1482–1483
Treasurer of St Paul's Cathedral 1479–1483
Almoner to King Edward IV

He was appointed to the sixth stall in St George's Chapel, Windsor Castle in 1472 and held the canonry until 1481 when he was appointed Dean of Windsor.

References 

1483 deaths
Canons of Windsor
Deans of Windsor
Treasurers of St Paul's Cathedral
Year of birth unknown
Principals of St Alban Hall, Oxford